Szabolcs Schindler  (born 26 October 1974) is a Hungarian football coach and a former player. Schindler has played nearly 300 matches in the Nemzeti Bajnokság I for clubs such as Videoton FC, MTK Hungária FC, Vasas SC and Budapest Honvéd FC.

External links
 Profile

1974 births
Living people
People from Kecel
Hungarian footballers
Hungarian Jews
Association football defenders
Fehérvár FC players
Gázszer FC footballers
MTK Budapest FC players
Vasas SC players
Békéscsaba 1912 Előre footballers
Pécsi MFC players
Budapest Honvéd FC players
Kecskeméti TE players
Hungarian football managers
Békéscsaba 1912 Előre managers
Dorogi FC managers
Vasas SC managers
Sportspeople from Bács-Kiskun County